Pierre Creek is a stream in the U.S. state of South Dakota.

Pierre Creek has the name of Pierre Dansreau, an early settler.

See also
List of rivers of South Dakota

References

Rivers of Hanson County, South Dakota
Rivers of South Dakota